Duchess of Edinburgh is the principal courtesy title held by the wife of the Duke of Edinburgh. There have been five Duchesses of Edinburgh since the title's creation. Following the accession of Charles III in 2022, the Dukedom of Edinburgh merged in the Crown. Following his parents’ wishes, on 10 March 2023, Charles III conferred the title Duke of Edinburgh to his youngest brother, Prince Edward, and his wife, Sophie, became the Duchess of Edinburgh.

1736

Princess Augusta of Saxe-Gotha was also Princess of Wales between 1736 and 1751, and Dowager Princess of Wales thereafter. Princess Augusta's eldest son succeeded as George III of the United Kingdom in 1760, as her husband, Frederick, Prince of Wales, had died nine years earlier.

1874

Grand Duchess Maria Alexandrovna of Russia was the fifth child and only surviving daughter of Tsar Alexander II of Russia and his first wife Tsarina Maria Alexandrovna. She was the younger sister of Tsar Alexander III of Russia and the paternal aunt of Russia's last Tsar, Nicholas II. In 1874, Maria Alexandrovna married Prince Alfred, Duke of Edinburgh, the second son of Queen Victoria and Prince Albert; she was the first and only Romanov to marry into the British royal family. In August 1893, Maria Alexandrovna became Duchess of Saxe-Coburg and Gotha when her husband inherited the duchy on the death of his childless uncle, Ernest II, Duke of Saxe-Coburg and Gotha. The new Duchess of Edinburgh was celebrated by rose grower Henry Bennett who named a bright crimson double hybrid tea rose he had bought from another grower (Schwartz) after her.

1947

Elizabeth II was Queen of the United Kingdom from her accession in 1952 to her death in 2022. Her husband Prince Philip of Greece and Denmark was created Duke of Edinburgh just before their wedding on 20 November 1947. From their marriage until her accession as Queen, Elizabeth was styled "Her Royal Highness The Princess Elizabeth, Duchess of Edinburgh."

Upon the death of Prince Philip on 9 April 2021, Prince Charles acceded to the dukedom. Thus, his wife, Camilla, became Duchess of Edinburgh. Upon the death of Elizabeth II, Camilla became Queen Consort and her husband's titles merged in the Crown.

2023

It was announced in 1999, at the time of the wedding of Prince Edward, Earl of Wessex, that he would eventually follow his father as Duke of Edinburgh. Edward was granted the dukedom on his 59th birthday, 10 March 2023, by his brother King Charles III. Prince Edward's wife, Sophie, became Duchess of Edinburgh.

Duchesses of Edinburgh

First holder

Subsidiary titles: Marchioness of the Isle of Ely, Countess of Eltham, Viscountess of Launceston, Baroness of Snaudon.

| Princess Augusta of Saxe-Gotha-AltenburgHouse of Saxe-Gotha-Altenburg (by birth)House of Hanover (by marriage)
| 
| 30 November 1719Gotha, Duchy of Saxe-Gotha-Altenburg–daughter of Frederick II, Duke of Saxe-Gotha-Altenburg and Princess Magdalena Augusta of Anhalt-Zerbst
| 8 May 1736Frederick, Prince of Wales9 children
| 8 February 1772aged 52
|-
|}

Second holder

Subsidiary titles: Countess of Kent, Countess of Ulster.

| Grand Duchess Maria Alexandrovna of RussiaHouse of Romanov (by birth)House of Saxe-Coburg and Gotha (by marriage)
| 
| 17 October 1853Alexander Palace, St. Petersburg–daughter of Alexander II of Russia and Princess Marie of Hesse and by Rhine
| 23 January 1874Prince Alfred 5 children
| 24 October 1920aged 67
|-
|}

Third and fourth holders

Subsidiary titles: Countess of Merioneth, Baroness Greenwich.

| Elizabeth IIHouse of Windsoralso: Queen of the United Kingdom (1952) and Head of the Commonwealth (1952)
| 
| 21 April 1926Mayfair, London–daughter of George VI and Lady Elizabeth Bowes-Lyon
| 20 November 1947Prince Philip of Greece and Denmark4 children
| 8 September 2022aged 96
|-|-
| Camilla ShandShand family (by birth)House of Windsor (by marriage)
|
| 17 July 1947King's College Hospital, London–daughter of Bruce Shand and The Hon. Rosalind Cubitt
| 9 April 2005Charles, Prince of WalesNo royal children
|  now  old
|-
|}

Fifth holder

Subsidiary titles: Countess of Wessex, Countess of Forfar, Viscountess Severn

| Sophie Rhys-JonesRhys-Jones family (by birth)House of Windsor (by marriage)
|
| 20 January 1965Radcliffe Infirmary, Oxford–daughter of Christopher Rhys-Jones and Mary O'Sullivan
|  19 June 1999Prince Edward 2 children
|  now  old
|-
|}

References

 
British monarchy
Lists of duchesses